, also known by the stage name , is a Japanese voice actress who was born in Chiba, Japan. She is part of ToriTori office.

Filmography

Anime television
Beet the Vandel Buster as Zeke
Coyote Ragtime Show as May
Digimon Tamers as Hirokazu Shiota
Hunter × Hunter (1999) as Pokkle
Konjiki no Gash Bell!! as Nicholas
Onegai My Melody as Cat News
Super GALS! Kotobuki Ran as Clerk (ep 26); Instructor (eps 7-8); Tan Face Red
Transformers: Cybertron as Coby
Transformers: Car Robots as Build Boy
Demashita! Powerpuff Girls Z as Butch
''Ojamajo Doremi' as Kenta Iizuka

External links
Home page (in Japanese)
 

Japanese voice actresses
Living people
1980 births